Forces spéciales is a 2011 French war adventure film directed by Stéphane Rybojad and starring Diane Kruger, Djimon Hounsou, Denis Ménochet, Benoît Magimel, Mehdi Nebbou, and Tchéky Karyo. Filmed on location in France, Djibouti, and Tajikistan, the film shows a group of elite French naval commandos on a desperate hostage rescue mission in the Afghanistan/Pakistan area.

Plot summary
Kabul-based French journalist Elsa Casanova (Diane Kruger) writes an article about warlord Zaief (Raz Degan) and names him "the butcher of Kabul". Her informer Maina (Morjana Alaoui) warns her that Zaief is out for vengeance. Before Maina returns to Zaief, she bids farewell to Elsa, because she is convinced that she will die by an honour killing. Elsa tries to hold her back but fails. Her friend Amen (Mehdi Nebbou)  urges Elsa to leave the country, but agrees to help her try and save Maina. Zaief ambushes and captures Elsa and  Amen. Amen asks Elsa to show no fear in front of Zaief. Still, she breaks down when their friend Salemani (Greg Fromentin) is cruelly murdered in her presence.

Zaief  publishes a video of Salemani's gruesome death, which eventually reaches the French government. A small French team, consisting of  4 Naval Commandos, 1 1st Marine Infantry Paratroopers Regiment and 1 Air Force Paratrooper Commando 10 (CPA10) members are entrusted with Elsa's rescue. They find Zaief's hideout in Pakistan and witness the execution of Maina. When they leave with Elsa and Amen, a bullet hits their wireless set. Without a means to contact their base, they cannot be found or picked up.

In lieu of another solution, they head for the Khyber Pass in order to reach their base in Afghanistan on foot. In the mountains, there is another firefight with Zaief's gunmen. 
 
When the fugitives come across a village, Elsa asks for hospitality. Whilst resting with the locals, Marius (Alain Alivon) is shot dead by a sniper, who is then killed by the team's own marksman Elias (Raphaël Personnaz). Later on, Zaief's gunmen arrive, and Zaief himself kills Amen. When Victor is hit, they retreat into the mountains.

Elias is the second of the team to be killed while luring Zaief's soldiers away. Victor, Kovax, Tic-Tac, Lucas, and Elsa soon run into a snowstorm, but Victor subsequently goes into shock and dies. Once again Zaief attacks, and Lucas is killed, Tic-Tac is injured and Kovax kills Zaief after he takes Elsa hostage.

They still have a long way to go when they are surprised by an avalanche. Kovax saves Elsa and Tic-Tac but in the process breaks one of his legs. The two men persuade Elsa to leave them behind. Elsa, although severely exhausted, reaches a road where she is rescued. She refuses to return to Paris and is lifted out of her wheelchair by Admiral Guezennec (Tchéky Karyo) who carries her on his back to a helicopter. Together they find Kovax and Tic-Tac still alive.

Cast

Diane Kruger as Elsa Casanova
Djimon Hounsou as Kovax
Denis Menochet as Lucas
Benoît Magimel as Tic-Tac
Raphaël Personnaz as Elias
Didier Flamand as Jacques Beauregard
Mehdi Nebbou as Amen
Morjana Alaoui as Maina
Tchéky Karyo as Admiral Guezennec
 as Victor
Alain Alivon as Marius
Raz Degan as Zaief

Soundtracks
The opening song in the movie when the troops are seen flying in choppers is E=MC2 by Big Audio Dynamite.
The song played at Kovax's birthday party is "Pick your God or Devil" by Robin Foster and Ndidi O.

Production
While filming the action scenes, the actors were overseen and advised by French naval special forces according to the press folder available on the official site. Moreover, one of their former chief instructors (Alain Alivon) played his own role.

Reception

Robert Abele of Los Angeles Times concluded that "It's not only Americans who can make leaden, video game-style exercises in dumb war action. [...] Writer/producer/director Stephane Rybojad likes his Islamic fundamentalists childishly ruthless, his Afghani victims helpless and his first-person-shooter heroes full of spit, vinegar and martyr-laced bravado."

Virgin Media has a rating of 46%,  judging that "With a strong cast featuring Diane Kruger and Djimon Hounsou, a powerful story and some sharp cinematography, this tense French action drama about the kidnapping of a journalist in Afghanistan is a nice change to your usual French cinema."

David Beckett of  Film 365 judged that "As far as wartime action/adventure films go, Special Forces isn't a great movie, but I found it to be a remarkable cinematic achievement and one which is extremely involving"

Cinevues Amy Wadsworth attested Forces spéciales to develop towards its end into "an engaging survival story of devotion and solidarity".

See also
Similarly themed movies:
The Wild Geese
La Légion saute sur Kolwezi
Ashanti (1979 film)
Let's Get Harry
Tears of the Sun
Act of Valor
The Sea Wolves

References

External links
 
 Forces spéciales at Uni France films
 In-depth review at Film 365
Review at Wordpress
Official homepage  
Newspaper article 

2011 films
2010s war adventure films
French war adventure films
2010s French-language films
War in Afghanistan (2001–2021) films
Films about war correspondents
Films set in Afghanistan
Films set in Pakistan
2011 directorial debut films
Films set in Kosovo
2010s French films